State Highway 113 (SH 113) is an  state highway in northeastern Colorado. It runs from U.S. Highway 138 (US 138) in rural Logan County north to Nebraska Highway 19 (N-19) at the Nebraska state line.

Route description

History
The route was established in the 1920s with its current routing from U.S. Highway 138 to Nebraska Highway 19 at the Nebraska state line. The route was entirely paved by 1939. Since then, there have been no major alignment changes in the routing.

Major intersections

References

External links

113
Transportation in Logan County, Colorado